The 2007 Notre Dame Fighting Irish football team represented the University of Notre Dame in the 2007 NCAA Division I FBS football season. The team was coached by Charlie Weis and played its home games at Notre Dame Stadium in South Bend, Indiana. For the first time in school history, Notre Dame opened the season with five losses (Notre Dame's worst opening prior to 2007 was 0–3). Their nine-loss season was also a school record.

Pre-season

Coaching changes
With the end of the 2006 season, two assistant coaches' contracts came up and were not renewed by the Irish. Rick Minter, the defensive coordinator who had been with the Irish since the 2005 season, was replaced by Corwin Brown, and Peter Vaas, the quarterback coach who had also been with the Irish since 2005 after David Cutcliffe left the position, was replaced by former Irish quarterback, Ron Powlus. Both Powlus and Brown played college football and had time playing in the NFL. Brown was previously an assistant coach for the New York Jets and Powlus had been Notre Dame's director of personnel development since 2005.

Roster changes
The Irish lost a number of players to graduation and the NFL. Former consensus All-American, and two-year starting wide receiver, Jeff Samardzija, was signed by Major League Baseball's Chicago Cubs as a pitcher, while twelve others were signed onto NFL teams. Former offensive starters Brady Quinn, Ryan Harris, and Dan Santucci and defensive starters Victor Abiamiri, Derek Landri, Mike Richardson, and Chinedum Ndukwe were taken in the 2007 NFL Draft, while five others, Marcus Freeman, Chris Frome, Travis Leitko, Rhema McKnight, and Darius Walker, signed contracts with NFL teams. The team returns three starters on offense and five on defense. Despite the number of high-profile losses, Weis refused to call it a "rebuilding year," citing a number of fifth-year seniors that he owes to try to win.

Recruiting
The Irish added 18 players to its roster with high school recruits. Included in the class were five-star quarterback recruit Jimmy Clausen, nine four star recruits on offense, and four on defense. The class was named a top-15 class by most media.

Award candidates
Four players were named to six national awards watch lists in the pre-season:
John Carlson – Maxwell Award
Maurice Crum Jr. – Bronko Nagurski Trophy, Chuck Bednarik Award, and Lott Trophy
John Sullivan – Dave Rimington Trophy and Outland Trophy
Tom Zbikowski – Bronko Nagurski Trophy, Chuck Bednarik Award, and Lott Trophy

Schedule
The 2007 Notre Dame schedule was ranked the 13th hardest in the country by Sports Illustrated. The road schedule was ranked as the 10th most difficult.

Roster

Coaching staff

Game summaries

Georgia Tech

While deciding who would be the starting quarterback two weeks before the opener, Weis, wanting to keep the Yellow Jackets guessing, would only tell the media that the quarterback and his backup knew their roles. Demetrius Jones started the game, with Evan Sharpley and Jimmy Clausen both seeing action as quarterback. Giving up nine sacks and two fumbles, and having negative 8-yards rushing, the Irish lost 33–3 in their most lopsided season opening loss in the history of the program.

Penn State

After the opening loss, Weis named freshman Jimmy Clausen the starting quarterback. Clausen would become the eighth Notre Dame freshman to start at quarterback since 1951 and would be the earliest to start when he faced the 15th ranked Penn State Nittany Lions in Happy Valley. The Nittany Lions won the game 31–10. The Irish ended the game with no rushing yards, and had only 144 total yards. They also amassed 97 yards in penalties.

Michigan

With both teams starting the season 0–2, for the first time ever a combined 0–4, the Irish next faced the Michigan Wolverines. Michigan played without their starting quarterback Chad Henne due to a leg injury. Michigan senior running back Mike Hart guaranteed a victory over the Irish.

Quarterback Demetrius Jones did not board a bus for the trip to Michigan. Charlie Weis issued a statement saying, "At 2:30 today, while boarding the bus to Michigan, I was notified that Demetrius Jones had decided not to make the trip. I have not spoken to Demetrius and can only say that he missed the team bus. Any additional comment would be without all the facts." On game day, it was reported that he had enrolled at Northern Illinois University, however, he later revealed that he was transferring to the University of Cincinnati.

Michigan won 38–0, tying their largest-ever win over Notre Dame set during the 2003 season. For only the second time in school history, Notre Dame opened the season with three losses.

Michigan State

Despite scoring their first two offensive touchdowns of the season (the first resulting from a fumble by MSU's quarterback, Brian Hoyer, at the 9-yard line), Notre Dame fell to Michigan State 31–14. For the first time in 119 seasons of Notre Dame football, the Irish had started a season 0–4. Michigan State also became the first opponent to win six in a row at Notre Dame Stadium.

Purdue

Despite outgaining the Boilermakers in total yards (426–371) and Clausen throwing his first collegiate touchdown, the Irish fell to 0–5 on the season to Purdue by a score of 33–19. Down 23–0 at halftime, the Irish came out in the second half and drove to a 37-yard touchdown drive with Clausen's pass to John Carlson. Clausen left the game afterwards with an undisclosed injury. Evan Sharpley replaced him and threw his first collegiate touchdown in the fourth quarter and later threw another to put the Irish down by a touchdown, but they wouldn't score again. The Irish had much trouble in their kicking game with only one extra point made on three attempts and a blocked field goal.

UCLA

UCLA was without its two starting quarterbacks. UCLA starter Ben Olson went out with a knee injury late in the first quarter, which left freshman walkon redshirt McLeod Bethel-Thompson to lead the Bruins. This was the first appearance for the Irish in the Rose Bowl stadium since the 1925 Rose Bowl. The Irish were able to capitalize on Bruin offensive mistakes to recover loose balls. This ended one of the worst slumps in Fighting Irish football, and prevented the Irish from equaling their longest losing streak in their history. In the 1960 NCAA University Division football season, the Irish lost eight straight games. The biggest cheer during the entire game came when the score of the 2007 Stanford vs. Southern California football game was announced. Fighting Irish and Bruins fans, who together are arch-rivals of the Trojans, cheered together.

Boston College

In a battle between the two Catholic schools, the unbeaten Boston College Eagles and Heisman-hopeful Matt Ryan faced off against the struggling Notre Dame Fighting Irish. Faced with constant blitzes from the Irish defense, Ryan used a short passing attack to lead the Eagles to a 20–0 lead early in the third quarter. Just as the game appeared headed for another blowout, Evan Sharpley, replacing an ineffective Jimmy Clausen, threw a touchdown pass to wide receiver Robby Parris followed by a pick six of Ryan during the next possession. With the score suddenly 20–14, the Eagles took advantage of good starting field position to answer with their own touchdown for the game's final score of 27–14.

USC

In what was the largest margin victory the Trojans have put forth on the Irish to date, Notre Dame was shut out by USC for the first time since 1998. USC came into this game 5–1, while Notre Dame came in 1–6. Notre Dame head coach Charlie Weis announced during that summer that his team would wear throwback green jerseys for the matchup, signifying the 30-year anniversary of the Irish beating the Trojans in their green jerseys in 1977, when Weis was a senior at Notre Dame. Because of John David Booty's injured finger, USC back-up quarterback, Mark Sanchez, was the starter. In his second game as a starter, Sanchez managed to complete 21 of 38 passes with a combined total of 235 yards and 4 touchdown passes. This was the Trojans' 6th consecutive victory over the Irish, and in the process they became only the third team to accomplish this feat (Michigan and Michigan State share the record with eight straight wins in non consecutive years).

Navy

Notre Dame came into the game with 43 consecutive wins against Navy since the last loss in 1963. In triple overtime, Navy (5–4) scored a touchdown and successful two-point conversion on their possession. Notre Dame (1–8) likewise scored a touchdown, but failed to make their own two-point conversion on a rush attempt.

Air Force

ESPN reported, "A week after the Midshipmen eked out a triple overtime victory against the Fighting Irish for the first time since 1963, Air Force beat Notre Dame 41–24 for its worst loss to a service academy since that Navy victory 44 years ago...It was the largest margin of victory for Air Force in six wins over the Irish and the biggest by a military academy since Navy beat the Irish 35–14 in 1963 behind Roger Staubach."

With the loss to Air Force, the Fighting Irish have lost nine games in one season for the first time in school history.

Duke

Notre Dame garnered its second win of the season in a game between what ESPN's Lee Corso called the two worst teams in major college football. Notre Dame was led with three Jimmy Clausen touchdown passes of 25, 25 and 9 yards each.  Freshman running back Robert Hughes also added a touchdown in the 3rd quarter.  The win would be the Irish's only home win of the season, avoiding what would have been its first winless season at home in 74 years.  The Irish gained 220 yards rushing behind the hard running of freshman tailbacks Robert Hughes and Armando Allen. After a scoreless first quarter, Notre Dame managed to capitalize on two forced fumbles in the final 1:12 of the 2nd quarter to take a 14–0 half time lead. Clausen was 16-for-32 for 194 yards and had his second straight three-touchdown game.

Stanford

The Irish concluded their season on a high note, winning its second straight game and its second win on the road.  Robert Hughes ran for 136 yards and the go-ahead 6-yard touchdown with 6:06 remaining in the 4th quarter to help the Irish beat Stanford 21–14.  Jimmy Clausen went 19–32 for 196 yards and one touchdown.  The game was one of missed field goals, turnovers and controversial calls against the Irish. The Cardinal missed 4 field goals and turned the ball over twice.  Notre Dame, meanwhile, committed 4 turnovers, including 3 fumbles and an interception.  Notre Dame would have added a score in the 3rd quarter, but a touchdown pass from Clausen to David Grimes was overturned on inconclusive evidence, despite the ruling on the field of a touchdown.

Notre Dame almost added another score on what would have been a spectacular finish to the half. David Bruton intercepted Stanford quarterback Tavita Pritchard's last-play heave at the 3-yard line and began a three-lateral return to the end zone that was called back on a personal foul on Notre Dame defensive lineman Trevor Laws.  Safety Tom Zbikowski ran the final 30 yards after a lateral from Darrin Walls.

Post season

Awards
Upon the conclusion of the 2007 season, several players won All-American honors.  Freshman standout Ian Williams was named to the 2007 AON Insurance Freshman All-America Team, the Football Writers Association of America announced during their annual banquet.  He was one of six true freshmen named to the defensive unit on the FWAA Freshman All-America Team and was one of 13 of the 28 freshman All-America selections who was a true freshman this season.  Williams was also named to the CollegeFootballNews.com all-freshman third team and was an honorable mention member of The Sporting News all-freshman team.  Seniors John Carlson and Trevor Laws also picked up second team Academic All-American honors from ESPN The Magazine and the College Sports Information Directors of America (CoSIDA).

NFL Draft
Four Notre Dame players were drafted in the 2008 NFL Draft.  Senior tight end John Carlson went 38th overall to the Seattle Seahawks.  Later in the second round, DE Trevor Laws was selected by the Philadelphia Eagles at 47th overall.  In the third round, safety Tom Zibikowski was the 86th selection, going to the Baltimore Ravens.  Center John Sullivan was the final Notre Dame draftee, going to the Minnesota Vikings in the sixth round.  Three players that were not drafted quickly signed with NFL teams as free agents following the NFL Draft: linebacker Joe Brockington signed with the Buffalo Bills, long snapper J.J. Jansen signed with the Green Bay Packers, while running back Travis Thomas joined former teammate and co-captain Brady Quinn in Cleveland.

References

Notre Dame
Notre Dame Fighting Irish football seasons
Notre Dame Fighting Irish football